Gianluca Franciosi (born 10 January 1991) is an Italian footballer who plays for ASD Chions.

Club career
Born in Monfalcone, in the Province of Gorizia, Italy, near to Italy–Slovenia border and Slovenian town Nova Gorica (new "Gorizia"), Franciosi started his professional career at Lega Pro Seconda Divisione club Valenzana. The club signed him from Atalanta B.C. in a co-ownership deal. That season Franciosi was the member of both first team and the reserves. In June 2011 Atalanta gave up the remain 50% registration rights of Franciosi to Valenzana for free. In January 2012 Franciosi was signed by fellow fourth tier club Giacomense.

In summer 2012 Franciosi left for Eccellenza (sixth tier at that time) newcomer Triestina. He scored 13 goals to bring the refounded club promoted to Serie D.

In summer 2013 Franciosi was signed by another Serie D club Clodiense. The club did not promote to the new third tier of Italian football, the unified single division of Lega Pro.

Franciosi remained in Serie D from 2014 to 2016, now fourth tier of Italian football, for Thermal Teolo, Correggese and Este. He only scored seven goals in one and a half seasons.

In June 2016 Franciosi crossed the border to join ND Gorica, where he participated in 2016–17 UEFA Europa League first qualifying round. Franciosi also played for Gorica in February in a club friendly.

Ahead of the 2019–20 season, Franciosi joined ASD Chions.

International career
Franciosi received a call-up to Italy national under-18 football team for a tournament in Slovakia in April 2009. He was a replacement of Marco D'Alessandro.

In the tournament he was the substitutes of Luca Tremolada and Matteo Calamai respectively.

References

External links
 Slovenian PrvaLiga profile 
 AIC profile (data by football.it) 
 

1991 births
Living people
People from Monfalcone
Footballers from Friuli Venezia Giulia
Association football forwards
Italy youth international footballers
Italian expatriate footballers
Italian footballers
Atalanta B.C. players
Valenzana Mado players
A.C. Giacomense players
U.S. Triestina Calcio 1918 players
ND Gorica players
NK Brda players
A.S.D. Pol. Tamai players
Slovenian PrvaLiga players
Serie C players
Serie D players
Expatriate footballers in Slovenia
Italian expatriate sportspeople in Slovenia